Olga Izmajlovna Semenova Tyan-Shanskaya (9 September 1911 – 4 November 1970) was a Soviet chess player.

She was born in Saint Petersburg, a niece of the Russian geographer Pyotr Semyonov-Tyan-Shansky. She learned to play chess at the age of 18; four years later she won the Leningrad city women's chess championship. She played in nine Women's Soviet Championships, winning two (1934 and 1936). In 1937 she took 2nd–3rd place, and in 1953 3rd–5th place.

She died in Leningrad.

References

 Chess Dictionary, Moscow, 1964, p. 333
 

1911 births
1970 deaths
Soviet female chess players
Sportspeople from Saint Petersburg
Russian female chess players
20th-century chess players